Hôpital Saint-François d'Assise is one three teaching hospitals affiliated with the medical school of Université Laval and several specialized institutions in Quebec City, Quebec, Canada.

The hospital merged in December 1995 with two other teaching hospitals to form Centre hospitalier universitaire de Québec:
Hôtel-Dieu de Québec
Centre hospitalier de l'Université Laval

References

External links
Official site

Buildings and structures completed in 1912
Hospitals in Quebec City
Teaching hospitals in Canada
Hospitals established in 1912
1912 establishments in Quebec